Cheong Liew  (born 1949) is a Malaysian-born Australian chef. He moved from Malaysia to Australia in 1969 to study electrical engineering, but instead became a chef.

Early life
Cheong Liew was born in 1949 in Kuala Lumpur, Malaysia. His father was a farmer who also owned several restaurants. Following the 13 May incident, Liew's family emigrated to Adelaide, South Australia. In Adelaide, Liew's passion for cooking was ignited while he tended the grill part-time at the Greek restaurant Iliad in Whitmore Square. Although he had planned to study electrical engineering in Melbourne, he eventually decided to become a self-taught chef.

Career
In 1975, Liew opened his own restaurant Neddy's, whose menu consisted of mostly Malaysian and Chinese dishes. His cooking incorporated ingredients not commonly used during his time, such as crocodile tail, pork leg, sea urchin and shark lip. The restaurant closed in 1988 and Liew went on to teach cookery at Regency Park, Adelaide.

In 1995, Liew took the reins at The Grange restaurant at the Hilton Hotel in Adelaide. At The Grange, Liew came up his "signature dish", titled "Four Dancers of the Sea", featuring "four varieties of seafood cooked in four distinct national styles". In 2009, after some 14 years, Cheong left The Grange; the restaurant closed at the end of the year.

Awards and honours
Described as "one of the indisputable fathers of Australian cooking" by Stephen Downes in To Die For (2006), Liew was awarded the Medal of the Order of Australia in the 1999 Queen's Birthday Honours "for service to the food and restaurant industry through involvement in developing and influencing the style of contemporary Australian cuisine. In 2017, Liew was honoured as "one of the ten hottest chefs alive" by the American publication Food & Wine Magazine, and inducted into the Hall of Fame in the World Food Media Awards.

Writing
 Liew, C., & Ho, E. F. (1995). My Food. St Leonards, N.S.W., Allen & Unwin.

References

See also
 South Australian food and drink

People from Adelaide
Living people
People from Kuala Lumpur
Australian chefs
Recipients of the Medal of the Order of Australia
Malaysian emigrants to Australia
1949 births